Arabis , or rockcress, is a genus of flowering plants, within the family Brassicaceae.

Description 
The species are herbaceous, annual or perennial plants, growing to 10–80 cm tall, usually densely hairy, with simple entire to lobed leaves 1–6 cm long, and small white four-petaled flowers. The fruit is a long, slender capsule containing 10-20 or more seeds. Natural habitat for Arabis species is rocky mountain/cliff sides or dry sites. Cultivation of Arabis is best suited for rock gardens or container gardens. This genus is pollinated by members of Apieae and Lepidoptera.

Taxonomy 
Though traditionally recognized as a large genus with many Old World and New World members, more recent evaluations of the relationships among these species using genetic data suggest there are two major groups within the old genus Arabis. These two groups are not each other's closest relatives, so have been split into two separate genera. Most of the Old World members remain in the genus Arabis, whereas most of the New World members have been moved into the genus Boechera, with only a few remaining in Arabis.

Species

Selected species
Arabis aculeolata
Arabis alpina (alpine rockcress)
Arabis armena (Armenian rockcress)
Arabis auriculata
Arabis blepharophylla (coast rockcress)
Arabis caucasica
Arabis cypria
Arabis glabra (tower mustard)
Arabis hirsuta (hairy rockcress)
Arabis kazbegi (Kazbegian rockcress)
Arabis kennedyae
Arabis lemmonii
Arabis macdonaldiana
Arabis procurrens (spreading rock cress)
Arabis pycnocarpa (slender rock cress)
Arabis scabra (Bristol rockcress)
Arabis serotina

Cultivation 
Some species, notably Arabis alpina, are cultivated as ornamental plants in gardens. Many others are regarded as weeds.

References

External links 
 Natural History Museum

 
Brassicaceae genera